Nalanda is a genus of beetles in the family Buprestidae, containing the following species:

 Nalanda acuta (Bourgoin, 1924)
 Nalanda alberti Descarpentries & Villiers, 1967
 Nalanda albopubens Descarpentries & Villiers, 1967
 Nalanda amethystina Descarpentries & Villiers, 1967
 Nalanda angustifrons Descarpentries & Villiers, 1967
 Nalanda annamita Descarpentries & Villiers, 1967
 Nalanda arrowi (Bourgoin, 1924)
 Nalanda atrata Descarpentries & Villiers, 1967
 Nalanda aureopubens Descarpentries & Villiers, 1967
 Nalanda bilyi Ohmomo & Akiyama, 1989
 Nalanda binhensis Descarpentries & Villiers, 1967
 Nalanda blaoensis Descarpentries & Villiers, 1967
 Nalanda buddhaica (Obenberger, 1931)
 Nalanda choganhensis Descarpentries & Villiers, 1967
 Nalanda chrysomelinus (Kerremans, 1892)
 Nalanda cochinchinae (Obenberger, 1924)
 Nalanda coeruleiventris Descarpentries & Villiers, 1967
 Nalanda convexifrons Descarpentries & Villiers, 1967
 Nalanda coomaniana Descarpentries & Villiers, 1967
 Nalanda cupreiventris Descarpentries & Villiers, 1967
 Nalanda cupreoapicalis Descarpentries & Villiers, 1967
 Nalanda cupricollis (Saunders, 1866)
 Nalanda cyaneoscutellaris (Bourgoin, 1924)
 Nalanda cyaneus (Fisher, 1922)
 Nalanda dalatensis Descarpentries & Villiers, 1967
 Nalanda delauneyi (van de Poll, 1892)
 Nalanda dessumi Descarpentries & Villiers, 1967
 Nalanda dongnaiensis Descarpentries & Villiers, 1967
 Nalanda exophtalma Descarpentries & Villiers, 1967
 Nalanda fleutiauxi (Bourgoin, 1924)
 Nalanda formosana (Obenberger, 1944)
 Nalanda frontalis Descarpentries & Villiers, 1967
 Nalanda glabra (Fisher, 1921)
 Nalanda granulata Descarpentries & Villiers, 1967
 Nalanda halperini Niehuis, 1997
 Nalanda harmandi (Baudon, 1962)
 Nalanda hideoi Ohmomo & Akiyama, 1989
 Nalanda horni Théry, 1904
 Nalanda komiyai Ohmomo & Akiyama, 1989
 Nalanda kurosawai Tôyama, 1986
 Nalanda kurosawana Ohmomo & Akiyama, 1989
 Nalanda lacthoensis Descarpentries & Villiers, 1967
 Nalanda lagerstraemiae Ohmomo & Akiyama, 1989
 Nalanda laotica (Bourgoin, 1924)
 Nalanda latifrons Descarpentries & Villiers, 1967
 Nalanda magnifica (Kerremans, 1892)
 Nalanda mandarina (Obenberger, 1927)
 Nalanda moi Descarpentries & Villiers, 1967
 Nalanda muong Descarpentries & Villiers, 1967
 Nalanda niisatoi Ohmomo & Akiyama, 1989
 Nalanda ohbayashii Kurosawa, 1957
 Nalanda ornatus (Fisher, 1921)
 Nalanda pentacallosa Ohmomo & Akiyama, 1989
 Nalanda perroti Descarpentries & Villiers, 1967
 Nalanda rutilicollis (Obenberger, 1914)
 Nalanda sericea Descarpentries & Villiers, 1967
 Nalanda shimomurai Ohmomo & Akiyama, 1989
 Nalanda suzukii Ohmomo & Akiyama, 1989
 Nalanda takashii Ohmomo & Akiyama, 1989
 Nalanda tonkinea Descarpentries & Villiers, 1967
 Nalanda toyamai Ohmomo & Akiyama, 1989
 Nalanda viridipennis (Fisher, 1921)
 Nalanda vitalisi (Bourgoin, 1924)
 Nalanda wenigi (Obenberger, 1927)

References

Buprestidae genera